Den ljusnande framtid är vår is a 1980 studio album by Swedish pop rock musician Magnus Uggla. It was released in July 1980, and is his filth studio album. The music and lyrics on the album departures from Uggla's earlier punk and hard rock style and instead tend towards new wave and electronic rock.

Two international singles were released, "Ain't About to Go Back"/"Scandal Beauties" and "Body Love"/"The Other Side".

"Centrumhets" is a cover of Nick Gilder's "Metro Jets", with new unrelated lyrics in Swedish.

Track listing
Side one
 "Mitt liv?" ("My Life?") - 4:45
 "Skandal bjotis – Det är inte kärlek, det är kramp" ("Scandal Beauties - It's Not Love, It's Cramp") - 4:10
 "Centrumhets" ("Metro Jets") - 4:15
 "Trendit, trendit" ("Trendy, Trendy") - 3:55
 "Vi möttes bara för en kväll" ("We Met Only for One Night") - 4:30
Side two
 "Just den där" ("That Special Someone") - 5:15
 "Jag vill inte tillbaks" ("Ain't About to Go Back") - 4:15
 "Panik" ("Panic") - 5:26
 "Någon som dej – Någon som du är" ("Someone Like You - Someone Like You Are") - 3:59

Charts

References 

1980 albums
Magnus Uggla albums
Swedish-language albums